Moses Mordecai Juwel (1798–1851) was a Galician Jewish scholar, who lived in Brody in the first half of the nineteenth century. 

He translated from the German into Hebrew Hufeland's Macrobiotik, or the art of prolonging human life, under the title Ruaḥ Ḥayyim (Lemberg, 1831); and a natural history, in four parts, under the title Limmude ha-Teva (Czernowitz, 1836). Juwel also wrote some ethical studies (Bikkure ha-'Ittim XII, 117 et seq.).

Bibliography

References
 

1798 births
1851 deaths
Jews from Galicia (Eastern Europe)
People from the Kingdom of Galicia and Lodomeria
People from Brody
People of the Haskalah
Translators from German
Translators to Hebrew